Naganpalli is a village in Chintaki hobli of Aurad taluka, Bidar district, Karnataka State, India.

References

Villages in Bidar district